Irvin Jerome Phillips (born January 23, 1960) is a former American football defensive back. Phillips was selected by the San Diego Chargers in the third round out of Arkansas Tech University in the 1981 NFL Draft. He played 15 games for the Chargers in 1981. In 1983, he played 5 games for the Los Angeles Raiders.

External links
NFL.com player page

1960 births
Living people
People from Leesburg, Florida
Players of American football from Florida
American football defensive backs
San Diego Chargers players
Los Angeles Raiders players
Arkansas Tech Wonder Boys football players